Diarrhena, or beakgrain, is a genus of Asian and North American plants in the grass family.

 Species
 Diarrhena americana P. Beauv.  - east-central United States (OK MO AR IL IN OH KY TN AL GA NC VA WV MD PA)
 Diarrhena fauriei (Hack.) Ohwi - Shandong, Jilin, Heilongjiang, Liaoning, Japan, Korea, Primorye
 Diarrhena japonica Franch. & Sav. - Japan, Jeju-do, Kuril, Jilin, Heilongjiang, Liaoning
 Diarrhena mandshurica Maxim. - Jilin, Heilongjiang, Liaoning, Primorye, Amur, Khabarovsk, Korea, Hebei, Shanxi
 Diarrhena obovata (Gleason) Brandenburg - Ontario, east-central United States (TX OK KS NE SD MN IA MO AR IL WI MI IN OH KY TN VA WV PA NY)

 formerly included
see Ammophila Catabrosa Cutandia Sphenopus Vulpia

References

External links
 

Poaceae genera
Pooideae